Adenosine thiamine triphosphate (AThTP), or thiaminylated adenosine triphosphate, is a natural thiamine adenine nucleotide.  It was discovered in Escherichia coli where it may account for up to 15 - 20% of total thiamine under carbon starvation. AThTP also exists in eukaryotic organisms such as yeast, roots of higher plants and animal tissues, albeit at a much lower concentration. It was found to exist in small amounts in the muscle, heart, brain, kidneys and liver of mice.

In E. coli AThTP is synthesized from thiamine diphosphate (ThDP) according to the following reaction catalyzed by thiamine diphosphate adenylyl transferase:

ThDP + ATP (ADP) ↔ AThTP + PPi (Pi)

Structure and function

The molecule is made up of thiamine and adenosine joined together with phosphate groups. It is similar in structure to NAD+. The function of AThTP is not currently known but it has been shown to inhibit the activity of PARP-1.

References

External links 
 
 

Nucleotides
Thiamine
Purines
Thiazoles
Pyrimidines
Phosphate esters